Heinz Gründel (born 13 February 1957 in Berlin)  is a former German footballer.

Gründel played in his entire career 161 matches in the Bundesliga and scored 24 goals. The midfielder played for West Germany on four occasions. In 1986, he was called up by then manager Franz Beckenbauer to the 26 men pre-squad for the World Cup in Mexico. Finally, he was cut out, together with later 1990 World Champion Guido Buchwald.

With Hamburger SV Gründel won the DFB-Pokal in 1987 winning 3–1 against Stuttgarter Kickers.

References

External links
 
 
 
 Heinz Gründel at eintracht-archiv.de 

1957 births
Living people
German footballers
Association football midfielders
Hertha BSC players
K. Waterschei S.V. Thor Genk players
Standard Liège players
Hamburger SV players
Eintracht Frankfurt players
Germany international footballers
Bundesliga players
Expatriate footballers in Belgium
Footballers from Berlin